Wienrode is a village and a former municipality in the district of Harz, in Saxony-Anhalt, Germany. Since 1 January 2010, it is part of the town Blankenburg am Harz.

Former municipalities in Saxony-Anhalt
Blankenburg (Harz)
Duchy of Brunswick